Kolki is a village development committee (administrative subdivision) in Nepal.

Kolki may also refer to:

Kołki, a village in Poland
Kolki, a village in Rajkot district, Gujarat, India
Kolki, Ukraine, a village or town depopulated of Jews during the Holocaust by the Nazis
Kolki, Lord of Chaos in the multiplayer fantasy role-playing game Order & Chaos Online